Yamaleela 2 is a 2014 Telugu fantasy drama film directed by S. V. Krishna Reddy. The film stars Dr. K. V. Satish, Diah Nicholas, Mohan Babu and Brahmanandam in the lead roles. The film is a spiritual sequel to the 1994 film Yamaleela. Brahmanandam reprised his role as Chitragupta from the original while Mohan Babu played Yama, which was played by veteran actor Kaikala Satyanarayana in the earlier film.

The film revolves around Krish (K. V. Satish), a medical professional, who goes to Manasarovar Lake to retrieve Sanjeevani, a herb which has the potential to cure cancer. There, Chitragupta (Brahmanandam), a trusted aide of lord Yama (Mohan Babu), meets Krish and gives him an important book; however, Krish steals the book and returns to Hyderabad. The rest of the story is about the reason behind Krish's trip to Himalayas and whether Yama and Chitragupta can retrieve their book from Krish.

Plot
The film follows the life of a medical professional, Krish (KV Satish), who is desperate to find cure for leukemia to save his niece. He's in love with his colleague Diah Nicolas (Anandi), who helps him in his endeavour. Soon, Krish heads to Manasarovar Lake in the Himalayas, where he wants to retrieve Sanjeevani, a herb which has the potential to cure leukemia. Along with the herb, he also brings along an important book, which originally belongs to Yama (Mohan Babu), the God of death. The rest of the story is about Yama and Chitragupta’s (Brahmanandam) endeavours to take back their book from Krish, as he struggles to stay alive to fulfill his goal of saving his niece, before he runs out of time.

Cast
Dr. K. V. Satish as Krish
Diah Nicholas as Anandi
Mohan Babu as Yama
Bramhanandam as Chitragupta
Sadha
Sayaji Shinde
Nisha Kothari
Kota Srinivasa Rao
Ali
M. S. Narayana
Rao Ramesh
Ashish Vidyarthi
Uttej
Thagubothu Ramesh

Soundtrack
 "Krishnam Bhaje"
 "Prana Bandama"
 "Hai Haigaa"
 "Daari Podugu"
 "Nuvvu Navvithe"
 "O Thayaru"
 "Andanda Pindanda"
 "Alara Chanchalamaina"

Reception
The Times of India wrote "Yamaleela 2 lacks energy and some of the scenes are so outdated that you begin to wonder if the film itself is stuck in a time warp just like its characters" and rated with 2 out of 5. Deccan Chronicle wrote "Film lacks freshness with the slow narration and when compare to the first one, this Yamaleela 2 is no match to it. You can watch it for only Mohan Babu’s impressive performance" and rated 2.5 out of 5.

References

2014 films
Indian fantasy drama films
Indian religious comedy films
2010s Telugu-language films
2010s fantasy drama films
Films directed by S. V. Krishna Reddy
Films scored by S. V. Krishna Reddy
2014 drama films
Yama in popular culture